Pegasus Bridge is a turn-based strategy video game developed and published by Personal Software Services. It was released exclusively in the United Kingdom for the ZX Spectrum, Amstrad CPC and Commodore 64 in 1987. It is the ninth installment of the Strategic Wargames series. The game is set during the landings in Normandy on D-Day in the Second World War and revolves around the British 6th Airborne Division's attempts to secure a bridge over the Caen Canal.

The game was designed by Alan Steel, who developed all of the games in the Strategic Wargames series. The player can assume control of either British or German forces, in which gameplay of Pegasus Bridge focuses on British forces securing various locations in Normandy or German forces defending the area from the attacking British. The game received mixed reviews upon release, with praise being directed at its "attractive" graphics, however a major bug which caused the game to crash was discovered during one reviewer's initial testing.

Gameplay

The game is a turn-based strategy and revolves around the British 6th Airborne Division's attempts to secure Bénouville Bridge (later renamed Pegasus Bridge, in honour of the battle) over the Caen Canal during the Normandy landings on 5 June 1944. The player is able to command either the British or German side in the game. Regardless of the side chosen, British units will not appear on the map at the beginning of the game as the British 6th Airborne Division have not yet made their parachute drops. German forces are distributed around the four far corners of the map, with a few units positioned near Bénouville Bridge. If playing as the British, the objective is to defeat all German forces and secure all bridges in the area, with the capture or destruction of the Merville Battery being the ultimate goal. If playing as the Germans, the only objective is to hold off all British attacks for 18 hours, which is the equivalent to 36 in-game turns.

Pegasus Bridge features ten different types of terrain, which affect the movement of the troops and the defensibility of certain areas. If units are situated in towns or woodland areas, their attacks will be less effective. High wind speeds will also render British parachuting troops temporarily ineffective. Units on the map are presented as small squares and can be stacked together to increase defence. While British forces may destroy various bridges throughout the game, certain bridges such as those over the Caen Canal and Orne river must be preserved in order to win the game.

Development
Personal Software Services was founded in Coventry, England, by Gary Mays and Richard Cockayne in November 1981. The company was known for creating games that revolved around historic war battles and conflicts, such as Theatre Europe, Bismarck and Falklands '82. The company had a partnership with French video game developer ERE Informatique and published localised versions of their products to the United Kingdom. The Strategic Wargames series was conceptualised by software designer Alan Steel in 1984. During development of these titles, Steel would often research the topic of the upcoming game and pass on the findings to other associates in Coventry and London. In 1983, the company received recognition for being "one of the top software houses" in the United Kingdom, and was a finalist for BBC Radio 4's New Business Enterprise Award for that year.

In 1986, Cockayne took a decision to alter their products for release on 16-bit consoles, as he found that smaller 8-bit consoles, such as the ZX Spectrum, lacked the processing power for larger strategy games. The decision was falsely interpreted as "pulling out" from the Spectrum market by video game journalist Phillipa Irving. Following years of successful sales throughout the mid 1980s, Personal Software Services experienced financial difficulties, in what Cockayne admitted in a retrospective interview that "he took his eye off the ball". The company was acquired by Mirrorsoft in February 1987, and was later dispossessed by the company due to strains of debt.

Reception

The game received mixed reviews upon release. Owen Bishop of Your Sinclair found a major bug during testing of the game which caused the game to crash, and ultimately affected his experience, stating that "being Brits [we] were obviously too gentlemanly to take advantage of such a situation". Bishop also criticised the high speed at which the in-game messages flash as "excessive". Philippa Irving of Crash criticised the presentation of the game, saying that the "annoying" key action ruined playability and that its controls were limited by a cursor. However, Irving praised its graphics and historical accuracy, stating that it was "attractive" yet "unatmospheric" and clearly based on the historical situation. A reviewer of Computer and Video Games called it an "excellent game", and praised its value for money. However, the reviewer criticised the "slow moving" pace of the game, as opposed to the fast tempo of the historical battle.

References

1987 video games
Amstrad CPC games
Commodore 64 games
Turn-based strategy video games
Video games developed in the United Kingdom
World War II video games
ZX Spectrum games
Personal Software Services games
Single-player video games